HMAS Parramatta (FFH 154) is an Anzac-class frigate of the Royal Australian Navy (RAN). One of ten warships built for the RAN and Royal New Zealand Navy (RNZN) based on the MEKO 200 design, Parramatta was laid down in 1999, launched in 2003, and commissioned into the RAN in 2003. During her career, the frigate has been deployed to the Middle East on several occasions. In early 2015, Parramatta was docked to undergo the Anti-Ship Missile Defence (ASMD) upgrade. She completed these upgrades in April 2016.

Design and construction

The Anzac class originated from RAN plans to replace the six River-class destroyer escorts with a mid-capability patrol frigate. The Australian shipbuilding industry was thought to be incapable of warship design, so the RAN decided to take a proven foreign design and modify it. Around the same time, the Royal New Zealand Navy (RNZN) was looking to replace four Leander-class frigates; a deterioration in New Zealand-United States relations, the need to improve alliances with nearby nations, and the commonalities between the RAN and RNZN ships' requirements led the two nations to begin collaborating on the acquisition in 1987. Tenders were requested by the Anzac Ship Project at the end of 1986, with 12 ship designs (including an airship) submitted. By August 1987, the tenders were narrowed down in October to Blohm + Voss's MEKO 200 design, the M class (later Karel Doorman class) offered by Royal Schelde, and a scaled-down Type 23 frigate proposed by Yarrow Shipbuilders. In 1989, the Australian government announced that Melbourne-based shipbuilder AMECON (which became Tenix Defence) would build the modified MEKO 200 design. The Australians ordered eight ships, while New Zealand ordered two, with an unexercised option for two more.

The Anzacs are based on Blohm + Voss' MEKO 200 PN (or Vasco da Gama-class) frigates, modified to meet Australian and New Zealand specifications and maximise the use of locally built equipment. Each frigate has a  full load displacement. A Combined Diesel or Gas (CODOG) propulsion machinery layout is used, with a single,  General Electric LM2500-30 gas turbine and two  MTU 12V1163 TB83 diesel engines driving the ship's two controllable-pitch propellers. The standard ship's company of an Anzac consists of 22 officers and 141 sailors.

As designed, the main armament for the frigate is a 5-inch 54 calibre Mark 45 gun, supplemented by an eight-cell Mark 41 vertical launch system (for RIM-7 Sea Sparrow or RIM-162 Evolved Sea Sparrow missiles), two  machine guns, and two Mark 32 triple torpedo tube sets (initially firing Mark 46 torpedoes, but later upgraded to use the MU90 Impact torpedo). They were also designed for but not with a close-in weapons system (two Mini Typhoons fitted when required from 2005 onwards), two quad-canister Harpoon anti-ship missile launchers (which were installed across the RAN vessels from 2005 onwards), and a second Mark 41 launcher (which has not been added). The Australian Anzacs use a Sikorsky S-70B-2 Seahawk helicopter; plans to replace them with Kaman SH-2G Super Seasprites were cancelled in 2008 due to ongoing problems.

Parramatta was laid down at Williamstown, Victoria on 24 April 1999. The ship was assembled from six hull modules and six superstructure modules; the superstructure modules were fabricated in Whangarei, New Zealand, and hull modules were built at both Williamstown and Newcastle, New South Wales, with final integration at Williamstown. She was launched on 17 June 2000. Parramatta was commissioned into the RAN on 4 October 2003.

Operational history
In 2005, Parramatta was sent for six months service in the Persian Gulf as part of Operation Catalyst, returning to Sydney on 13 April 2006. During the deployment period, her crew carried out 186 vessel boardings and security patrols, and were involved in training other vessels in the Iraq Coalition. Parramatta was awarded the Meritorious Unit Citation in 2007 for her efforts and conduct during this deployment.

In December 2011, while deployed to the Middle East, Parramatta provided fuel and food to an Iranian dhow that was adrift off Yemen.

In October 2013, Parramatta participated in the International Fleet Review 2013 in Sydney.

In November 2014, Parramatta and sister ship  were deployed to shadow a Russian naval force operating in international waters off Australia during the 2014 G-20 Brisbane summit. The Russian deployment was believed to be in response to troubled recent relationships between the two nations.

Parramatta was docked in March 2015 to undergo the Anti-Ship Missile Defence (ASMD) upgrade. The upgrade will include the fitting of CEA Technologies' CEAFAR and CEAMOUNT phased array radars on new masts, a Vampir NG Infrared Search and Track system, and Sharpeye Navigational Radar Systems, along with improvements to the operations room equipment and layout. The upgrade was completed in April 2016 and she rejoined the fleet in July.

During late 2019 the frigate took part in efforts to enforce sanctions against North Korea as part of Operation Argos.

Citations

References
Books

Journal articles

News articles

Websites

External links

 RAN webpage for HMAS Parramatta (IV)

Anzac-class frigates of the Royal Australian Navy
Naval ships of Australia
2000 ships
Recipients of the Meritorious Unit Citation